Berthold Reisfeld (Vienna, 1906 - Badenweiler, 1991) was a lyricist, noted for adapting lyrics to well-known songs either to or from English. The songs he wrote English lyrics for include:

 "It's Oh So Quiet", adapted from the German song "Und Jetzt ist es Still" by Horst Winter,
 "The Three Bells", adapted from the French song "Les trois cloches" by Jean Villard Gilles
 "Baciare Baciare (Kissing Kissing)" by Dorothy Collins.

He also co-wrote the instrumental "Morning Mood" with Glenn Miller in 1941 as a trombone solo with piano accompaniment.

He also translated "These Boots Are Made for Walkin' into the German "Die Stiefel Sind Zum Wandern" which was recorded by Eileen Goldsen.

Notes

Austrian songwriters
Male songwriters
1991 deaths
1906 births
20th-century male musicians